James Blair may refer to:

James Blair (Australian judge) (1870–1944), Australian judge, lawyer, and politician
James Blair (cricketer) (1900–1961), Australian-born New Zealand cricketer
James Blair (farmer) (1825–1901), Scottish-born farmer in Upper Canada
James Blair (footballer) (died 1913), Scottish professional footballer
James Blair (futures trader) for Hillary Rodham Clinton and outside counsel to Tyson Foods (see Cattlegate)
James Blair (Indian Army officer) (1828–1905), Scottish military general, recipient of the Victoria Cross
James Blair Jr., mayor of Williamsburg, Virginia, 1769–70
James Blair (American lawyer) (1762–1837), Attorney General of Kentucky, 1797–1820
James Blair (Medal of Honor), U.S. Army First Sergeant, recipient of the Medal of Honor during the Indian Wars
James Blair (MP) (c. 1788–1841), British Member of Parliament
James Blair (rower) (1909–1992), American Gold medalist in the 1932 Olympics
Jimmy Blair (soldier) (1761–1839), Revolutionary War soldier
James Blair (South Carolina politician) (1786–1834), General of the South Carolina 5th Militia Brigade and U.S. Representative of South Carolina
James Blair (clergyman) (1656–1743), Scottish-born American clergyman in the Virginia Colony, founder of The College of William & Mary
James G. Blair (1825–1904), American lawyer and U.S. Representative from Missouri
James Hunter Blair (1926–2004), Scottish historic preservationist, landowner and forester
James P. Blair (born 1931), American photographer
James S. Blair (fl. 1930s), Scottish footballer with Third Lanark
James T. Blair Jr. (1902–1962), American politician; Lieutenant Governor and 44th Governor of Missouri, 1957–1961
Jim Blair (Scottish footballer) (1947–2011)
Jim Blair (Australian footballer) (1874–1953), Australian rules footballer
Jim Blair (ice hockey), Canadian ice hockey player, see 1963–64 Boston Bruins season
Jimmy Blair (footballer, born 1888) (1888–1964), Scottish professional footballer
Jimmy Blair (footballer, born 1918) (1918–1983), one of his sons and brother of Doug Blair
Sir James Hunter Blair, 1st Baronet (1741–1787), Scottish banker, landowner and politician

See also 
James Blair Middle School, a middle school in Williamsburg, Virginia